James Taylor Jr. may refer to:

 James Taylor Jr. (banker) (1769–1848), American banker and early settler of Kentucky
 James Taylor Jr. (Exclusive Brethren) (1899–1970), American leader of the Exclusive Brethren

See also
James Taylor (disambiguation)